The Chinese Taipei Masters was an international badminton tournament held in Taiwan from 2015 to 2016. The level of the tournament was BWF Grand Prix tournament.

Past winners

Performances by nation

 
Badminton tournaments in Taiwan